William Cuthbertson (21 July 1902 in Dunfermline – 24 November 1963) was a British flyweight boxer who competed in the 1920s. He won the bronze medal in Boxing at the 1920 Summer Olympics losing against Danish boxer Anders Petersen in the semi-finals.

Boxing career
Cuthbertson won the 1921 Amateur Boxing Association British flyweight title, when boxing out of the United Scottish BC.

1920 Olympic result
 Round of 16: defeated Einer Jensen (Denmark)
 Quarterfinal: defeated Ted Zegwaard (Netherlands)
 Semifinal: lost to Anders Pedersen (Denmark)
 Bronze-Medal Bout: defeated Charles Albert (France); was awarded bronze medal

References

External links
William Cuthbertson's profile at databaseOlympics
William Cuthbertson's profile at Sports Reference.com

1902 births
1963 deaths
Sportspeople from Dunfermline
Flyweight boxers
Olympic boxers of Great Britain
Olympic bronze medallists for Great Britain
Boxers at the 1920 Summer Olympics
Place of birth missing
Olympic medalists in boxing
Scottish male boxers
Medalists at the 1920 Summer Olympics
Scottish Olympic medallists